Danny F II (originally Don Carlos) was a cargo ship built in 1975 as a car carrier. She was renamed Danny F II when rebuilt as a livestock transporter in 1994. The ship capsized and sank off Lebanon on 17 December 2009, carrying 83 people, 10,224 sheep, and 17,932 cattle. 40 people were rescued and 11 found dead. The other crew, passengers and animals are presumed to have died.

Construction
Don Carlos was built by Oy Wärtsilä Ab Turku shipyard, Finland, as yard number 1220. She was launched on 14 November 1975, and completed in April 1976. The ship was 14,478 GT, 7,258 NT and 14,800 DWT.

History
Don Carlos was built for Rederei AB Soya, Stockholm. Originally a car carrier, she was delivered on 30 April 1976. In October 1985, Don Carlos was transferred to Wallenius Lines Singapore Ptd Ltd, Singapore. In July 1994, she was sold to BSA Transportation Pte, Ltd. of Singapore and renamed Danny F II.

Danny F II arrived at Singapore on 15 August 1994, for rebuilding as a livestock transporter. The work was carried out by Pan United Shipyards. She was sold in 1995 to Rachid Fares Enterprise Proprietary, Fremantle, and reflagged to Liberia. On 25 April 2000, she was registered to Danny F II, St Vincent and the Grenadines. Madona had developed a severe list after her cargo shifted. On 24 October 2005, Danny F II was registered to Falcon Point International, Panama.

In 2005, it was reported that Danny F II had been detained at Adelaide because of defects which included holed bulkheads, defective navigation lights and radio equipment and defective watertight doors.

Sinking
On 17 December 2009, Danny F II capsized and sank in bad weather in the Mediterranean Sea,  from Tripoli, Lebanon,  (not to be confused with the Libyan city of the same name), while sailing from Montevideo, Uruguay, to Tartus, Syria, carrying six passengers, 77 crew, 10,224 sheep and 17,932 head of cattle. The ship's British captain, John M Milloy, is reported to have remained on board when the ship rolled over in the high seas.

After a distress call made at 15:55 local time (13:55 UTC), a rescue effort was launched comprising ships from the United Nations Interim Force in Lebanon (UNIFIL) CTF 448 under the command of Italian Navy rear admiral, Francesco Sandalli, onboard ITS Zeffiro. Among the rescuers were two German Navy ships, as part of the CTF 448, and small rescue boats from Lebanese Armed Forces (LAF). A Bell Griffin HAR2 helicopter from 84 Squadron, Royal Air Force, based at RAF Akrotiri and Cyprus Police Aviation Unit helicopters (Bell 412s) following a request from the rescue coordination centre in Larnaca were dispatched to assist in the rescue.

Rescue efforts were hampered by poor weather conditions, high waves and floating carcasses from the ship's livestock cargo. Rescue operations stopped after 72 hours later with 40 men rescued, 11 found dead and 32 men remained missing and presumed dead. All the livestock were presumed dead.

References

1975 ships
2009 disasters in Asia
2009 in Lebanon
December 2009 events in Asia
Livestock transportation vehicles
Maritime incidents in 2009
Merchant ships of Liberia
Merchant ships of Panama
Merchant ships of Saint Vincent and the Grenadines
Merchant ships of Singapore
Merchant ships of Sweden
Shipwrecks in the Mediterranean Sea